Cosby may refer to:

 Cosby (surname)
 Bill Cosby (born 1937), American stand-up comedian, actor, and author

Media 

 Cosby (TV series), an American sitcom that ran from 1996 to 2000, starring Bill Cosby
 The Bill Cosby Show, an American sitcom starring Bill Cosby that ran from 1969 to 1971 on NBC, starring Bill Cosby
 The Cosby Show, an American sitcom that ran from 1984 to 1992, starring Bill Cosby
 The Cosby Mysteries, a television mystery series that ran from 1994 to 1995, starring Bill Cosby
 House of Cosbys, a parody cartoon series

Places 

 Cosby, Leicestershire, an English village
 Cosby, Missouri, a village
 Cosby, Tennessee, an unincorporated town
 YMCA Camp Cosby, a camping site in Alpine, Talladega County, Alabama